Kliph is a given name. Notable people with the name include:

Kliph Nesteroff, American author
Kliph Scurlock (born 1973), American musician